Catocala francisca or Catocala hermia francisca is a moth of the family Erebidae. It is found in California.

Adults are on wing from June to September depending on the location. There is probably one generation per year.

References

External links
Species info
Images

Moths described in 1880
francisca
Moths of North America